Simira standleyi is a species of plant in the family Rubiaceae. It is endemic to Ecuador.

References

Flora of Ecuador
standleyi
Critically endangered plants
Taxonomy articles created by Polbot
Plants described in 1969